Randal Smith may refer to:

Randall Smith, (born 1960), Canadian musician
Randall D. Smith (born 1943/44), American hedge fund manager
Randall Lee Smith, (died 2008), American, convicted murderer
Randal Smith, 2nd Baron Bicester
Randall Brian Smith (baseball)

See also
Randy Smith (disambiguation)